Nicole Anne Cross (born May 30, 1985) is a retired American soccer player. She last played for the Houston Dash of the National Women's Soccer League in the 2015 season; the team acquired her via trade with the Washington Spirit on December 2, 2014.  She retired partway through the 2015 season, making her last appearance on August 1 against the Washington Spirit.

Club career

Connecticut Huskies
Cross played in 92 career games ranking 13th on the UConn Games Played list.

She played for the Boston Renegades in 2004. In 2005 she played for Women's Premier Soccer League (WPSL) club Bay State Select, alongside Brazil national team players Daniela Alves Lima and Raquel de Souza Noronha. She made two appearances.

Umeå Södra FF
On August 11, 2008, Cross joined Swedish Damallsvenskan club Umeå Södra FF.

2010
In 2010 Cross attended FC Gold Pride's pre-season camp but was released. Her club Saint Louis Athletica then folded two months into the season. She joined Boston Breakers as a developmental player between June and August, but only played for the reserve team Boston Aztec in the Women's Premier Soccer League (WPSL). After being released again she was signed by FC Gold Pride until the end of the season. Following the American season she traveled to Australia to play for Newcastle Jets.

Medkila IL
On August 31, 2011, Cross inked a contract in Norway with Medkila IL.

FC Bayern Munich
On January 12, 2012, Cross joined German Bundesliga side FC Bayern Munich. On May 9, 2012, Cross signed a new two-year contract to remain in Munich. On May 12, 2012, she was part of the FC Bayern Munich squad who dethroned the German Cup title holders 1. FFC Frankfurt with a 2–0 in the 2011–12 final in Cologne and celebrated the biggest success of the club's history since winning the 1976 championship.

Honours

Club
FC Bayern Munich
 Frauen DFB-Pokal: 2011–12

Personal life
Cross holds a German passport.
Married Molly S Bodell on Feb. 6th 2016. Sister-in-law Adelaide Bodell.

References

External links
 Niki Cross profile at Houston Dash
 
 
 

1985 births
Living people
American women's soccer players
UConn Huskies women's soccer players
Saint Louis Athletica players
FC Gold Pride players
American expatriate women's soccer players
Newcastle Jets FC (A-League Women) players
Boston Breakers players
American expatriate sportspeople in Norway
Expatriate women's footballers in Norway
American expatriate soccer players in Germany
FC Bayern Munich (women) players
Frauen-Bundesliga players
Women's association football defenders
Washington Spirit players
Houston Dash players
National Women's Soccer League players
Soccer players from Massachusetts
Medkila IL (women) players
Boston Aztec (WPSL) players
Women's Premier Soccer League players
Damallsvenskan players
Women's Professional Soccer players
USL W-League (1995–2015) players
Boston Renegades players